The Bristol Orion aero engine was a two-shaft turboprop intended for use in later marks of the Bristol Britannia and the Canadair CL-44. Although the engine was built and underwent a development program, the BE.25 Orion project was cancelled in 1958 by the British Ministry of Supply in favour of the Rolls-Royce Tyne. In addition, interest in turboprop-powered aircraft was beginning to wane, because of the successful introduction of the Boeing 707 and Douglas DC-8 jetliners into airline service.

The Orion gas generator had been chosen by French aircraft designer Wibault to power a vectored thrust aircraft which ultimately became the Hawker Siddeley P.1127 but with a Bristol Siddeley Orpheus gas generator which had a compressor derived from the Orion low pressure compressor.

Design and development
A single-stage HP turbine drove a five-stage all-axial HP compressor, while a three-stage LP turbine drove both the seven-stage LP compressor and the propeller, via a reduction gearbox. Thus the Orion used a shared-load LP turbine (like the Rolls-Royce Tyne), whereas its predecessor, the Bristol Proteus, had a free-power turbine.  The combustor used separate flame cans.

One novel feature of the Orion was a derate from a thermodynamic rating of 9,000 shp at sea level, to enable a constant 5,150 ehp power level to be maintained up to 15,000 ft altitude.

The Orion project was cancelled in January 1958, at a reported total cost of £4.75 million.

Applications
Bristol Britannia
Canadair CL-44

Specifications (BOn.1 Orion)

See also

References

Further reading

 
 
 
 
 

1950s turboprop engines
Orion